The 2007 Winter European Youth Olympic Festival was an international multi-sport event held in Jaca, Spain between 18 and 24 February 2007.

Sports

Venues
Venues used in 2007 Winter European Youth Olympic Festival.

Mascot
The mascot for this edition of Winter European Youth Olympic Festival is a white bird wearing blue jersey.

Medalists

Alpine skiing

Biathlon

Cross-country skiing

Figure skating

Ice hockey

Snowboarding

Medal table

References

External links
 Results

 
2007 in Spanish sport
Youth Olympic Winter Festival
2007
International sports competitions hosted by Spain
Youth sport in Spain
Multi-sport events in Spain
Sports festivals in Spain
2007 in youth sport
February 2007 sports events in Europe